The 2017 Brisbane Global Tens was the inaugural Brisbane Global Tens rugby union tournament, with all five of New Zealand's Super Rugby teams, all four of Australia's Super Rugby teams contesting for the title as the core sides, while the Blue Bulls of South Africa, the Panasonic Wild Knights of Japan, Toulon of France, and Manu Samoa competed as invitational sides. It was held at Suncorp Stadium. The draw was released on 16 November 2016. The prize money was AU$1.6 million.

The tournament was won by the Chiefs who defeated the Crusaders in the final 12-7.

Squads
There were expected to be up to 500 players named across the 14 squads of the teams competing in the 2017 Brisbane Global Tens. Each team was also allocated a "Legend Wildcard", allowing each team to select a former player of high stature, significance and/or legacy to their former club to join the additional match day squad.

Note that players in bold indicates they are internationally capped at test level, while players in italics were an allocated "Legend Wildcard" for their side.

All ages were correct on 2 February 2017.

Blue Bulls

Blues

Brumbies

Chiefs

Crusaders

Highlanders

Melbourne Rebels

Panasonic Wild Knights

Reds

Samoa

Waratahs

Tournament matches

Pool A

Pool B

Pool C

Pool D

Pool C/D cross-over matches
In order to complete the same number of pool matches as the teams in Pools A and B, teams in Pool C and D faced one team from the other pool in a cross-over match as their third pool match of the tournament. In these cross-over matches, the Blue Bulls faced the Western Force, the Brumbies played Toulon, and the Highlanders competed against the Hurricanes.

Finals
The top eight teams from day 1 progressed to the quarter finals on day 2.

Quarter finals

Semi-finals

Final

References

Rugby tens
Sport in Brisbane
2017 in Australian rugby union
2017 rugby union tournaments for clubs